B. M. Faizur Rahman (1930 — 30 October 2012) was a Bangladesh Awami League politician and the former member of parliament for Chittagong-13.

Early life
He was born in 1930 in Chittagong district under Satkania Upazila at Kanchana Union. He was the son of an influential Muslim League family. He passed LMF degree from the then Chittagong Medical School. The Chittagong General Hospital was then called Chittagong Medical School.

Political life
On the advice of MA Aziz, a close associate of Bangabandhu, Fayez, a son of a Muslim League family, was nominated as an MPA from the Awami League in the 1970 provincial election from the present Chandnaish constituency of Satkania (partial) and Patia (partial) from Chittagong-13.
On 17 December 1970, he elected as MPA at Provincial Assembly election from Chittagong-13 (P.E-293) and also he was elected to parliament from Chittagong-13 as a Bangladesh Awami League candidate in 1973. He served as the vice-president of South Chittagong District unit of Bangladesh Awami League. Rahman also was the chairman of Kanchana Union from 1968 to 1969.  He died on 30 October 2012 in Dhaka, Bangladesh, aged 82.

References

Awami League politicians
1st Jatiya Sangsad members
1930 births
2012 deaths
People from Satkania Upazila